The Farm Credit System Insurance Corporation (FCSIC) is an entity of the Farm Credit System (FCS), established by the Agricultural Credit Act of 1987, to insure the timely repayment of principal and interest on FCS debt securities.

See also 
 Title 12 of the Code of Federal Regulations
 Federal Crop Insurance Corporation

External links 
 
 Farm Credit System Insurance Corporation in the Federal Register

Farm Credit System
Corporations chartered by the United States Congress
Government-owned companies of the United States